SpyBoy may refer to:
1998 Emmylou Harris album Spyboy
SpyBoy the comic Series
 a type of position in New Orleans Mardi Gras Indian tribes.